The National Ballet of Rwanda, also known as the Urukerereza National Ballet, is a Rwandan dance company. It was created in 1974 at the behest of President Juvenal Habyarimana. Their long-running show features traditional Rwandan songs, drums and dances (not European ballet). 

Its name Urukerereza literally means "the one that causes you to delay", referring to how it holds the attention of the audience. Urukerereza was the national dance-music troupe formed in the 1970s by the Ministry of Youth and Culture. Urukerereza became the ballet’s senior troupe with the formation of the junior national troupe, called Indangamirwa. 
The junior troupe was formed by Simon Bikindi, supervisor of cultural activities, in 1985.  The juniors trained at the former mwami’s palace in Nyanza.

They regularly take part in dance festivals and perform abroad. In 2000, the company made its first visit to North America and performed at the Seattle International Children's Festival.

References

See also 
Other ballets of non-European traditional dances:
 Les Ballets Africains, Guinea
 Royal Ballet of Cambodia

 

Dance companies
Rwandan culture
Performing groups established in 1974
1974 establishments in Rwanda